Hamilton King Management Limited is a property management company specialising in residential apartments and developments throughout the United Kingdom.

History
Hamilton King deals in a range of developments, from new builds to older developments that have been refurbished or renovated; handling maintenance of common areas within complexes; arrangement of finances; collection of rents and service charges and property management services.

Hamilton King Management Limited's registered offices are located at Altrincham, Greater Manchester. The Altrincham office principally handles financial administration operations and resources as well as arranging insurance.

Hamilton King Management Limited's London office is situated Enfield, Middlesex. The London office deals with the company's estate portfolio, and is primarily responsible for liaising with lessees, particularly on maintenance issues; coordinating repairs; routine maintenance; landscaping gardens and maintaining common areas of the management company's properties as well as regulatory compliance, including hiring consultants and contractors and carrying out all necessary risk assessments. The company provides a range of services to lessees, including sourcing, instructing and referring contractors, and co-ordinating repairs and refurbishment projects.

Hamilton King Management Limited was incorporated on 30 November 1993. It is a registered company in England and Wales under company number 02876669.

References

Companies based in Trafford
Property management companies